Dr. Donald McGillivray Elder (born November 1958) is a New Zealand engineer and businessman. He was the CEO of the New Zealand state-owned coal miner Solid Energy for more than a decade.

Biography 
Don Elder was born in Christchurch, New Zealand, in November 1958. He attended high school at Christ's College and graduated from the University of Canterbury with a degree in engineering. He then gained a Rhodes Scholarship, to go to Oxford University. Later, he moved back to New Zealand and became CEO of Solid Energy.

Elder resigned as CEO of Solid Energy on 4 February 2013, having served as the CEO for 12 years since May 2000.

Elder currently lives in Christchurch, New Zealand.

References

1958 births
Alumni of Wolfson College, Oxford
Living people
New Zealand Rhodes Scholars
People from Christchurch
University of Canterbury alumni
People educated at Christ's College, Christchurch
20th-century New Zealand businesspeople
20th-century New Zealand engineers
21st-century New Zealand businesspeople
21st-century New Zealand engineers